Sir Kariamanikkam Srinivasa Krishnan,  (4 December 1898 – 14 June 1961) was an Indian physicist. He was a co-discoverer of Raman scattering, for which his mentor C. V. Raman was awarded the 1930 Nobel Prize in Physics.

Early life
Kariamanikkam Srinivasa Krishnan generally referred to as K. S. Krishnan or KSK, was born in a Vaishnavite brahmin family on 4 December 1898 in Watrap, Tamil Nadu. His father was a farmer-scholar deeply versed in Tamil literature. He had his early education in Hindu Higher Secondary school, in Watrap, after which he attended the American College in Madurai and the Madras Christian College. After gaining his degree in Physics he became a demonstrator in chemistry.

Early career

In 1920, Krishnan went to work with C.V. Raman at the Indian Association for the Cultivation of Science, Kolkata (then Calcutta). There he engaged himself in experimental study of the scattering of light in a large number of liquids and its theoretical interpretations. He played a significant role in the discovery of the Raman scattering.

In 1928 he moved to the Dacca University (now in Bangladesh) as the Reader in the physics department where he studied magnetic properties of crystals in relation to their structure. Krishnan, along with other rising scientists such as Santilal Banerjee, B.C. Guha, and Asutosh Mukherjee developed an elegant and precise experimental technique to measure the magnetic anisotropy of diamagnetic and paramagnetic crystals. Their findings were published by the Royal Society of London in 1933 under the title, Investigations on Magne-Crystallic Action.

In 1933 he returned to Kolkata to take up the post of Mahendralal Sircar Professor of Physics in the Indian Association for the Cultivation of Science where he continued to collaborate fruitfully with Banerjee to elaborate on the magnetic properties of crystals in relation to their structure. Their joint papers and communications (published in Nature, Terrestrial Magnetism and Atmospheric Electricity, and by the Royal Society), remain to this day, aside from a number of other pathbreaking contributions they also published in various Physics journals, the most definitive scientific studies on the structure and tendencies of small crystals. Their experiments in Dacca and continued collaborative research in Kolkata led to what is now known as the Krishnan Banerjee method for measuring the magnetic susceptibility of small crystals.

Krishnan was elected as Fellow of the Royal Society (FRS) in 1940.  His Royal Society candidature certificate in 1935 read:
"Distinguished for his investigations in molecular optics and in magne-crystalline action:collaborated with Sir C.V. Raman in extensive theoretical and experimental studies on light scattering, molecular optics and in the discovery of the Raman Effect (1928). More recently has been publishing many valuable investigations (Phil Trans Royal Society and elsewhere) on the significance of magnetic anisotropy in relation to crystal architecture and thermo-magnetic behaviour at the lowest temperatures. Has published important work on pleochroism in crystals and its relation to photo-dissociation. Leader of an active school of research in Calcutta."

In 1942, he moved to Allahabad University as Professor and Head of the Department of Physics where he took up the physics of solids, in particular of metals.

He was knighted in the 1946 Birthday Honours List and awarded the Padma Bhushan by the Government of India in 1954. He was the first recipient of the prestigious Bhatnagar Award in 1958.

On 4 January 1947 K. S. Krishnan was appointed first director of National Physical Laboratory India. This was one of the earliest national laboratories set up under the Council of Scientific and Industrial Research.

Quotes about Krishnan
 What is remarkable about Krishnan is not that he is a great scientist but something much more. He is a perfect citizen, a whole man with an integrated personality. – Jawaharlal Nehru

Collected works
The scientific papers of K. S. Krishnan have been published in 1988 by the National Physical Laboratory (located on Dr K.S. Krishnan Road, New Delhi 110012). The book of 950 pages has been made available in the Public Library of India collection of the Internet archive at https://archive.org/details/in.ernet.dli.2015.502306

See also

 Raman scattering
 Magnetic anisotropy

References

External links

 Scientists Biography page on K S Krishnan, in Vigyan Prasar, Government of India

1898 births
1961 deaths
Recipients of the Shanti Swarup Bhatnagar Prize for Science and Technology
Experimental physicists
Knights Bachelor
Indian Knights Bachelor
Recipients of the Padma Bhushan in science & engineering
20th-century Indian physicists
University of Madras alumni
Scientists from Tamil Nadu
Fellows of the Royal Society
Fellows of the Indian National Science Academy
Foreign associates of the National Academy of Sciences
University of Calcutta alumni
Academic staff of the University of Dhaka
Tamil scientists
Indian theoretical physicists
Indian astrophysicists